

Buildings and structures

Buildings
 1001
 The Cathedral of Ani is built in Armenia.
 St. Michael's Church, Hildesheim begun.
 1002 – Brihadishwara Temple of Thanjavur, India (Chola Empire) begun.
 1008 – Rebuilt Torcello Cathedral in the Veneto consecrated.
 1009 – Saint-Martin-du-Canigou in Catalonia consecrated.
 By c. 1010 – Church of the Saviour at Berestove built.
 1011 – San Vittore alle Chiuse in Genga, Papal States built.
 c. 1012 – Katholikon of Hosios Loukas built in Byzantine Greece.
 1013
 Al-Hakim Mosque in Cairo, Fatimid Empire built (begun in 990).
 San Miniato al Monte begun in Florence, Italy (work went on until the 13th century).
 1016 – San Michele in Borgo in Pisa, Tuscany built.
 c. 1017 – Hōjōji (法成寺) built in Heian-kyō, Japan.
 1021 – Church of the Quedlinburg Abbey, Holy Roman Empire built (begun c. 997).
 1022 – Monastery of Sant Pere de Rodes, Catalonia consecrated.
 c. 1023 – Romanesque church at Mont-Saint-Michel founded.
 c. 1025 – City of Gangaikonda Cholapuram founded as a capital of the Chola Empire.
 1026 – Pomposa Abbey near Ferrara, Italy, completed (except the campanile finished in 1063).
 1029 – Construction of Sant Vicenç de Cardonia, Catalonia begun.
 1030 – Speyer Cathedral, Germany, initiated by Emperor Konrad II.
 1032 – Santa Maria de Ripoll, Catalonia is consecrated.
 1033 – St. Michael's Church, Hildesheim, Holy Roman Empire, completed and consecrated.
 1036 – Al-Aqsa Mosque in Jerusalem restored and renovated by the Fatimid caliph after an earthquake in 1033.
 1037
 Chartres Cathedral in France consecrated for the fifth time (subsequently rebuilt).
 St Sophia Cathedral in Kyiv founded.
 1040
 Sant Vicenç de Cardona, Catalonia is completed.
 Construction of Notre-Dame-de-Jumièges in Normandy begins.
 Construction of the third Würzburg Cathedral in the Holy Roman Empire begins.
 1045 – Lingxiao Pagoda (凌霄塔) in Zhengding, China is completed.
 1047 – Reconstruction of St Mark's Basilica in Venice begins.
 1049
 Saint Rémi of Reims Basilica in France is consecrated
 Iron Pagoda (鐵塔) of Bianjing, China is completed.
 Abbey Church of Ottmarsheim, Alsace is consecrated.
 c. 1050
 West Mebon built in Angkor.
 Rajarani Temple built in Bhubaneswar, Odisha.
 Construction of Église Notre-Dame de l'Assomption, Rouffach, begins.
 1050
 Abbaye Notre-Dame de Bernay in Normandy completed.
 Construction of Basilica of Sant'Abbondio in Como, Lombardy begins.
 1053
 Varadharaja Perumal Temple of Kanchipuram in India (Chola Empire) built.
 Phoenix Hall of the Byōdō-in in Heian-kyō, Japan built.
 1055 – Liaodi Pagoda (料敵塔), Hebei, China is completed
 1056 – Sakyamuni Pagoda of Fogong Temple (佛宫寺释迦塔), Shanxi, China is completed
 1057
 Church of Monastery of San Salvador of Leyre, Navarra consecrated.
 Near Caves (Pechersk Lavra) founded.
 1059 – Abbaye aux Dames, Caen founded.
 c. 1060
 Construction of the Baphuon in Yasodharapura, Khmer Empire.
 Lawkananda Pagoda built in Bagan, Pagan Kingdom.
 1061 – Speyer Cathedral, Germany, completed.
 1062 – Construction of Abbaye aux Dames, Caen, Normandy begun.
 1063
 Rebuilding of Doge's Palace, Venice begun.
 Basilica of San Isidoro, León, Spain, Spain consecrated.
 c. 1063 – Abbaye-aux-Hommes, Caen, Normandy founded.
 1064
 Abbey of Lessay, Normandy begun.
 Duomo of Santa Maria Assunta in Pisa, Tuscany begun.
 1065 – Sankt Maria im Kapitol, Cologne consecrated.
 1067
 Abbey of Jumièges, Normandy consecrated.
 First of the Kharraqan towers built in Qazvin, Seljukid Iran.
 Sankt Gereon, Cologne begun.
 1068 – Warwick Castle established as a motte-and-bailey fortification by William I of England.
 1070 – Nidaros Cathedral in Trondheim, Norway, begun.
 1075 – Würzburg Cathedral reconstruction completed (begun in 1045).
 1075 – Pilgrimage Church of St James, Santiago de Compostela begun.
 1076 – Abbey of Gellone, Saint-Guilhem-le-Désert in the Languedoc completed.
 1077
 Abbaye-aux-Hommes, Caen, France consecrated.
 Current Bayeux Cathedral, France consecrated.
 1078 – White Tower (Tower of London) in England begun.
 c. 1078 – Duomo of Santa Maria Assunta in Pisa, Tuscany, completed.
 1080 – Rebuilding of St. Sernin's Basilica, Toulouse begun.
 1081
 Current building of the Chora Church built in Constantinople (begun in 1077).
 Old Mainz Cathedral destroyed by a fire, marking the beginning of the construction of the current building.
 Aljafería Palace built in Zaragoza, Spain (begun in 1065).
 1082 – Great Mosque of Tlemcen built in the Almoravid Empire.
 1083 – Present Ely Cathedral in the east of England begun.
 1086–87 – South dome of Jameh Mosque of Isfahan in Seljuq dynasty Persia, the world's largest dome at this time.
 By 1087 – Construction of the Church of Christ Pantepoptes in Constantinople begun.
 1087
 White Tower (Tower of London) (begun in 1078) probably largely completed.
 San Nicola di Bari begun.
 1088
 Rebuilding of great church at Cluny Abbey in France ("Cluny III") begun.
 Eynsford Castle built in England.
 1089 – Romanesque stage of St Albans Cathedral in England completed.
 c. 1090 – Abbey Church of Saint-Savin-sur-Gartempe in Poitou completed (begun c. 1040).
 1091
 Cairo Fatimid city wall built (begun in 1087).
 Ananda Temple built in Bagan, Pagan Kingdom capital.
 1093
 Second of the Kharraqan towers mausoleums built in Qazvin, Seljukid Iran.
 Maria Laach Abbey in the Rhineland begun.
 Durham Cathedral founded in the north of England.
 1094
 40-foot-tall water-powered astronomical clocktower in Song dynasty's capital Bianjing designed by Su Song completed.
 San Juan de la Peña Monastery in Aragon consecrated.
 St Mark's Basilica in Venice consecrated.
 c. 1094 – Battle Abbey in England consecrated.
 1095 – Sant'Abbondio, Como consecrated.
 1096
 St. Sernin's Basilica, Toulouse consecrated.
 Norwich Cathedral begun in eastern England.
 1097
 Construction of the original stage of the Flower Pagoda in the Temple of the Six Banyan Trees in Guangzhou, Song dynasty.
 Djamaa el Kebir mosque of Algiers built in Almoravid Algeria.
 1098 – Trani Cathedral begun.
 1099 – Modena Cathedral begun.
 By c. 1099 – Lingaraja Temple Bhubaneswar, Odisha, largely completed.

Births
 c. 1081 - Abbot Suger (died 1151), French abbot-statesman and patron of Gothic architecture.

Deaths
 1020 - Trdat the Architect (born c. 940s), Armenian

References